Kenneth of Scotland may refer to:
Kenneth I of Scotland, aka Kenneth MacAlpin, (died 858), king of the Picts and arguably the first king of the Scots
Kenneth II of Scotland, nicknamed "The Fratricide", (before 954–995), King of Scotland
Kenneth III of Scotland, nicknamed "the Chief" or "the Brown", (before 967–1005)